Major-General Luang Wichitwathakan (also known as just Wichit Wichitwathakan) (Thai หลวงวิจิตรวาทการ, วิจิตร วิจิตรวาทการ; Chinese 金良) (11 August 189831 March 1962) was a Thai politician, diplomat, historian, novelist, and playwright. He was the originator and prime mover responsible for changing the name of the country from Siam to Thailand.

Luang Wichitwathakan was prominently engaged in politics and the modernization of Thailand and was in his time the most important figure in the establishment of Thai national identity. He was the chief ideologue and creator of cultural campaigns during the pre-World War II military rule of Field Marshal Plaek Pibulsonggram, aimed at increasing the sense of nationalism of the Thais.

Early life
Wichitwathakan was born Kim Liang (Chinese: 金良), the son of a merchant in Uthai Thani Province. According to a cousin, Wichitwathakan's paternal grandfather was Chinese.

He received his primary education in a Buddhist temple school in Uthai Thani and continued the Buddhist education at Wat Mahathat in Bangkok where he excelled in Buddhist studies, reaching a high stage of Prien and graduating first in the kingdom. At the age of 16 years, he received royal award from King Vajiravudh for academic excellence.

While still a monk in Wat Mahatat, Wichitwathakan wrote extensively in papers which he circulated among the monks. The papers were written in English, French, or German and were sometimes inflammatory regarding temple rules and regulations. This was finally stopped by the abbot, who prohibited the use of Western languages.

At the age of 20, Wichitwathakan decided to leave the monkhood in favor of secular life and was admitted to the Ministry of Foreign Affairs as a junior clerk. From this position in 1918,  Wichitwathakan rose, through his own exceptional capability and diligence, to become Minister of Foreign Affairs in 1942.

Service in France
In 1921, Wichitwathakan was posted to the Royal Siamese Legation (equivalent to present-day embassy) in Paris, France, as Third Secretary. During his five years in Europe, Wichitwathakan served as a member of the Siamese delegation that attended and participated in deliberations of the League of Nations in Geneva, Switzerland. He also studied law and political science at the University of Paris. It was in Paris that he developed close friendships with the future revolutionaries, Pridi Phanomyong, also studying Law at Sorbonne, and Plaek Pibulsongkram, a military officer studying artillery in France.

Marriage
While in Paris, Wichit took French lessons from Lucienne Laffitte (née Guillaume), a cultivated French lady who was well-read and musically gifted. They subsequently married and together returned to Siam in the year 1927. While Wichitwathakan continued to work at the Ministry of Foreign Affairs, Madame Lucienne collaborated with him in several of his important historical publications, notably Prawatsart Sakon (Universal History). Despite this creative partnership and the  births of a son and a daughter, the marriage dissolved six years later and Madame Lucienne returned to France with her two children. Luang Wichitwathakan subsequently married Prapapan Raphiphan (Khunying Prapapan Vichit-Vadakan), a teacher of history and daughter of Khoon Vorasarndarunkit who was in charge of education in northern Siam under King Rama V.

In Siam
After his return to Siam, Wichitwathakan met again with Pridi Phanomyong and Plaek Pibulsongkram, the conspirators of the Siamese coup d'état of 1932.

Wichitwathakan was chairman of the committee which proposed changing the country's name from Siam to Thailand at the state convention in 1939. He led an irredentist campaign after being presented a map produced by Ecole Francaise d'Extreme Orient showing the Thai race inhabiting the areas of Siam, Burma, and southern China. Wichitwathakan estimated from this map that there were approximately 60 million Thais inhabiting the lands of southern China and Southeast Asia, and through his personal crusade as both a historian and a politician, as well as chairman of the parliamentary committee in charge of making the name change, succeeded in changing the name of the country from Siam to Thailand when the state convention ratified the committee's proposal in 1939.

Revolutionary role
Although Wichitwathakan did not participate in the revolution against King Prajadhipok, he performed an important role in the conversion from absolute monarchy to constitutional monarchy. When Pridi Phanomyong started the clandestine party called Khana Ratsadon (People's Party), he consulted with former Thai friends from Paris, namely Field Marshal Pibulsongkram, Wichitwathakan, Prayun Phamonmontri, and Thatsanai Mitraphakdi. Pridi Phanomyong specifically asked Wichitwathakan to join this secret association, whose purpose was to overthrow the absolute monarchy. Wichitwathakan at this point in time still maintained loyalty to King Prajadhipok and was in favor of a conciliatory approach with regard to the Siamese royalty. Concerned about the socialistic and communistic ideology of Pridi Phanomyong, Wichitwathakan formed a royalist and free enterprise party called Kana Chart (National Party) while continuing to attend the clandestine meetings of the Khana Ratsadon Party.

When King Prajadhipok indicated his willingness to support the armed royalist challenge to the People's Party and gave his blessing to Prince Bovoradej to mobilize his soldiers and attack Bangkok, Wichitwathakan forsook his loyalty to the king to align himself with the representative government as a member of the national assembly. While Pibulsongkram fought the insurrection of Prince Bovoradej militarily, Wichitwathakan played an important political role by being in charge of convincing the public and uncommitted military forces in the provinces to side with the government.

Wartime service

In 1942, Wichitwathakan became Minister of Foreign Affairs under Prime Minister Field Marshal Pibulsongkram and was responsible for negotiating free passage for the invading Japanese army in exchange for maintaining the sovereignty and independence of Thailand. He then assumed the duty of Thai Ambassador to Japan during the remainder of World War II, being stationed in Tokyo. Upon the unconditional surrender of Japan to the Allies at the end of World War II, Wichitwathakan was arrested by the US occupying forces along with the German Ambassador, Italian Ambassador, and the entire Japanese Cabinet. His wife, Khunying Wichitwathakan, requested and obtained a personal audience with General Douglas MacArthur during which she succeeded in explaining to him that as foreign minister, her husband had no alternative but to negotiate a treaty of free passage in exchange for maintaining the independence of Thailand. General Douglas MacArthur released Wichitwathakan from imprisonment and allowed him to return to Thailand on an American airplane. On arrival to Bangkok, Wichitwathakan was rearrested and imprisoned by the new postwar government of Prime Minister Khuang Aphaiwong. Wichitwathakan was incarcerated along with former Prime Minister Field Marshal Pibulsongkram, to be tried in Thai court as war criminals. Among the principal allied forces, the British and the French wanted Pibulsongkram and Wichitwathakan to face the firing squad while the US alone insisted on a trial before punishment. Subsequently, all charges against them were dropped for lack of corroborating evidence. Field Marshal Pibulsongkram and Luang Wichitwathakan were acquitted of all political accusations and released from incarceration.

Post-war service
After having been granted freedom, Luang Wichitwathakan temporarily dissociated himself from politics and became a nationally prominent playwright, author, and historian. Most of his plays, songs, fictions as well as history and religious books were composed during the three years following his release from incarceration.

In 1947, Luang Wichitwathakan assisted Field Marshal Pibulsongkram in staging a coup d'état which toppled the existing government from power. Wichitwathakan served in the new government as Minister of Finance and Minister of Economic Affairs and subsequently became Ambassador to India in 1952 and Ambassador to Switzerland, Austria, and Yugoslavia in 1953. He also promoted the unification and nationalism of the people of Thailand by composing a series of nationalistic theatrical works, known as the Anupap series, which were performed at the National Theater. This series of  plays, titled Anupap Porkoon Ramkamhaeng (Power of King Ramkamhaeng), Anupap Haeng Kwam Seasara (Power of Sacrifice), Anupap Haeng Kwam Rak (Power of Love) were composed at the urging of Prime Minister Pibulsongkram with the purpose of strengthening the unity and cohesiveness of the Thai people.

In 1958, Luang Wichitwathakan participated in the coup d'état staged by Field Marshal Sarit Thanarat and removed Field Marshal Pibulsongkram from power. Wichitwathakan assumed the title of Paladbunchagarn of the Prime Minister's Office, equivalent to the position of Vice Prime Minister, Chef du Cabinet, or Secretary-General of Office of the Prime Minister. He served Field Marshal Sarit as his closest confidant and advisor and politically played an active role in promoting the nationalism of the people of Thailand.

Wichitwathakan died in 1962 at age 64 after a long cardiac illness.

Appointments
1934-1942: Director General of the Department of Fine Arts
1942-1943: Minister of Foreign Affairs
1943-1945: Ambassador to Japan
1951-1952: Minister of Finance
1952: Minister of Economic Affairs
1952-1953: Ambassador to India
1953-1957: Ambassador to Switzerland, Austria and Yugoslavia
1957-1962: Paladbunchagarn - Office  of the Prime Minister

Published works

Plays
 Leod Supan (Blood of Supan) 
 Rachamanu 
 Suek Talang (Battle of Talang 
 Pra jao Krung Thon (King of Thonburi) 
 Tai Dab Na (Death at next Sword) 
 Po Kun Pa Mueng (King Pa Mueng) 
 Petch Pra Narai (Diamond of King Narai 
 Lan Leod Lan Rug (Territory of Blood Territory of Love) 
 Sriharajdecho 
 Dab Saen Mueng (Sword of a Hundred Thousand Cities) 
 Pra Naresuan Pragard Issarapap (King Naresuan Declares Independence) 
 Rachatida Pra Ruang (Royal Daughter of Pra Ruang) 
  Jao Ying Gannigar (Princess Gannigar) 
 Jao Ying Sanwee (Princess Sanwee) 
 Krut Dum (Black Garuda) 
 Anupap Po Kun Ramkamhang (Power of King Ramkamhang) 
 Anupap hang Kwam Rug (Power of Love) 
 Anupap Hang Kwam Seasara (Power of Sacrifice)

Fiction

 Pan Tong Rong Leod (Golden Receptacle for Blood) 
 Dok Fa Jampasak (Celestial Flower of Jampasak) 
 Ballang Chieng Rung (Throne of Chieng Rung) 
 Morasum Hang Cheevit (Tempest of Life) 
 Petch Pra Narai (Diamond of King Narai) 
 Plee Cheep Pue Choo (Sacrificing Life for Lover) 
 Huang Rug Hav Luek (Bond of Love Deep Crevice) 
 Fak Fa Salawin (Horizon of Salawin) 
 Athit Asadong (Western Sunset) 
 Lek Lang Kan (Iron for Vengeance)

Non-Fiction

 Mun Samong (Brain) 
 Puttanupap (Power of Buddhism) 
 Jittanupap (Power of Mind) 
 Manusapatiwat (Human Revolution) 
 Mahaburus (Great Men) 
 Kong Dee Nai India (Good things in India) 
 Vicha Paed Pragarn (Eight Sources of Knowledge) 
 Vicha Krong Ruen Krong Rug (Science of Domesticity and Love) 
 Vitee Tam Ngarn lae Srang Anakot (Way to Work and Build Future) 
 Anakot kong Chart (Future of Nation) 
 Sangsawang Nai Kwam Mued (Brightness in The dark) 
 Sassana Sagol (Universal religion) 
 Prawatsart Sagol (Universal History) 
 Watanatum Sukothai (Civilization of Sukothai) 
 Kwam Fun (Dream)

References

Sources
 
 

20th-century Thai historians
Thai politicians
Thai nationalists
Thai diplomats
Thai generals
Luang (nobility)
Members of the 1st House of Representatives of Thailand
Members of the 2nd House of Representatives of Thailand
Members of the 3rd House of Representatives of Thailand
Members of the 4th House of Representatives of Thailand
Members of the 5th House of Representatives of Thailand
Members of the 6th House of Representatives of Thailand

Ministers of Foreign Affairs of Thailand
Ministers of Commerce of Thailand
Ministers of Finance of Thailand
Academic staff of Chulalongkorn University
Academic staff of Thammasat University
Ambassadors of Thailand to India
Ambassadors of Thailand to Japan
Ambassadors of Thailand to Switzerland
Ambassadors of Thailand to Austria
Ambassadors of Thailand to Yugoslavia
People from Uthai Thani province
Thai politicians of Chinese descent
Thai collaborators with Imperial Japan
University of Paris alumni
1898 births
1962 deaths
Thai fascists